Central reservation or central reservations may also refer to:
Central reservation, the area separating opposing lanes of traffic on a divided road
Central Reservation (album), a 1999 album by Beth Orton
"Central Reservation" (song), a 1999 song by Beth Orton
Central Reservations, a 1997 compilation album from Grand Central Records
Central Reservations Office, a call center for hotel reservations